North Carolina's 37th Senate district is one of 50 districts in the North Carolina Senate. It has been represented by Republican Vickie Sawyer since 2023.

Geography
Since 2023, the district has covered all of Iredell County, as well as part of Mecklenburg County. The district overlaps with the 84th, 89th, 95th, and 98th state house districts.

District officeholders since 1993

Election results

2022

2020

2018

2016

2014

2012

2010

2008

2006

2004

2002

2000

References

North Carolina Senate districts
Iredell County, North Carolina
Mecklenburg County, North Carolina